The 2015 Chinese Football Association Division Two League season was the 26th season since its establishment in 1989. It was divided into two groups, North and South. There were 16 teams participating in the league, 8 teams in North Group and 8 teams in South Group. The league was made up of two stages, the group stage and the play-off. The group stage was a double round-robin format. Each team in the group will play the other teams twice, home and away.

Team changes

Promotion and relegation 
Teams promoted to 2015 China League One
 Jiangxi Liansheng 
 Taiyuan Zhongyou Jiayi
 Guizhou Zhicheng

Teams relegated from 2014 China League One
 Chengdu Tiancheng

Teams promoted from 2014 China Amateur Football League 
 Anhui Litian
 Baoding Yingli ETS
 Baotou Nanjiao
 Guangxi Longguida

Dissolved entries 
 Chengdu Tiancheng
 Shandong Tengding
 Sichuan Leaders

Name changes 

Pu'er Wanhao was renamed Yunnan Wanhao.

Clubs

Managerial changes

Clubs Locations

Group stage standings

North Group

South Group

Group stage results

North Group

South Group

Play-offs

Quarter-finals

First leg

Second leg

Semi-finals

First leg

Second leg

Third-Place Match

Final Match

Attendance

Top scorers

Awards
The awards of 2015 China League Two were announced on 18 November 2015.
 Most valuable player:  Hu Zhaojun (Dalian Transcendence)
 Top scorer:  Liu Yang (Tianjin Huochetou)
 Best coach:  Qi Wusheng (Meizhou Kejia)

References

External links
Official site 
News and results at mytiyu.cn 

3
China League Two seasons